Rancho San Antonio a  Spanish land grant in present-day Los Angeles County, California was granted to Antonio Maria Lugo.  The rancho included the present-day cities of Bell, Bell Gardens, Maywood, Vernon, Huntington Park, Walnut Park, Cudahy, South Gate, Lynwood and Commerce.

History
Corporal Antonio Maria Lugo, after seventeen years of military service, received his discharge and was granted the Spanish concession Rancho San Antonio in 1810. The grant was confirmed in 1838 to Antonio Maria Lugo by Mexican Governor Juan B. Alvarado. On Rancho San Antonio he built Casa de Rancho San Antonio the oldest home in Los Angeles County, California.

With the cession of California to the United States following the Mexican–American War, the 1848 Treaty of Guadalupe Hidalgo provided that the land grants would be honored. As required by the Land Act of 1851, a claim was filed with the Public Land Commission in 1852, and the grant was patented to Antonio Lugo in 1866.

In 1855 Antonio Maria Lugo, partitioned the Rancho—reserving a homestead for himself—among his sons, José Maria, Felipe, Jose del Carmen, Vicente and José Antonio, and his daughters, Vicenta Perez, Maria Antonia Yorba, and Merced Foster. In 1860 Merced Foster and Vicente Lugo sold their respective portions to parties who immediately resorted to subdivision and sale in small lots. The first deed is from Isaac Heiman to David Ward, dated June 21, 1865; followed by other sales in 1865 and 1866.

In 1908 Michael Cudahy acquired the remaining 2,800 acre (11 km2) Rancho San Antonio. He subdivided the ranch and sold it as one acre (4,000 m2) lots.  This area was incorporated in 1960 as the City of Cudahy.

Historic sites of the Rancho
 Gage Mansion. Named after Henry Gage, a one-time occupant, the ranch house was built in 1795 and is the oldest house in Los Angeles County.

See also
Ranchos of California
List of Ranchos of California

References

External links
Map of old Spanish and Mexican ranchos in Los Angeles County

San Antonio (Lugo grant)
San Antonio (Lugo)
Cudahy family
1810 in Alta California
1810 establishments in Alta California
Bell, California
Bell Gardens, California
Commerce, California
Huntington Park, California
Maywood, California
South Gate, California
Vernon, California
19th century in Los Angeles